1st Marine Imam Hossein Brigade is a marines brigade of Islamic Republic of Iran Navy based in Bandar Abbas, Hormozgan. The unit is one of top Takavar units among Iranian Armed Forces. The brigade operates in Persian Gulf and is able to operate 3,000 kilometers away from its HQ.

Mission set  
According to the US government, Islamic Republic of Iran Navy MARSOF "probably is trained in a variety of capabilities, including combat diving, parachuting, amphibious assault, airborne assault, underwater demo- litions, special reconnaisance, and maritime visit, board, search, and seizure (VBSS) operations. IRIN SBS personnel are also capable of covert insertion from the IRIN’s midget submarines.

References 

Special forces of Iran
Iranian marine brigades
Amphibious landing brigades
Hormozgan Province